Samir Said  (5 November 1963 – 15 April 2012) was a professional  Kuwaiti football goalkeeper who played for Kuwait in the 1984 Asian Cup.

Death 
On April 15, 2012 he died in a car accident.

Honours 

Asian Cup:
Third Place : 1984

References

External links
Stats

Kuwait international footballers
Kuwaiti footballers
1984 AFC Asian Cup players
1988 AFC Asian Cup players
Kuwaiti people of Iranian descent
2012 deaths
1963 births
Footballers at the 1990 Asian Games
Road incident deaths in Kuwait
Association football goalkeepers
Asian Games competitors for Kuwait
Al-Arabi SC (Kuwait) players
Kuwait Premier League players